This is the list of Philippine television telenovela drama series that originally aired or are set to air on the television network ABS-CBN and its ad interim replacements Kapamilya Channel and A2Z, GMA Network and TV5. Titles are sorted by the decade and the year of release. Reality drama anthologies are excluded.

Lists
Note: In the following list, these original titles have different official international titles (based on ABS-CBN International Distribution website) in parentheses.

Notes

See also
List of Philippine drama series

References

ABS-CBN
 
Lists of Philippine television series
ABS-CBN
Original drama series of ABS-CBN